Liuzhou Sports Centre (Simplified Chinese: 柳州体育中心) is a multi-purpose stadium in Liuzhou, China.  It is currently used mostly for football and basketball matches.  The stadium holds 35,000 people.

References

Football venues in China
Multi-purpose stadiums in China
Sports venues in Beijing
Guangxi Pingguo Haliao F.C.